Sunderland West End Football Club is a football club based in Sunderland, Tyne and Wear, England.

History
Sunderland West End played in the inaugural Wearside League season in 1892–93, finishing bottom after winning just one game in eighteen. In the following season, West End again finished bottom with one win. Sunderland West End returned to the Wearside League in the 1900–01 season, finishing third, before finishing just one point behind league winners Sunderland Rovers in the 1901–02 season. On 10 December 1904, Sunderland West End suffered a 9–0 defeat against Bradford City in the FA Cup sixth qualifying round. In the first full season after the culmination of World War I, West End finished fourth, before finishing second, behind Seaham Harbour, in the 1920–21 season. The club finished fourth for four consecutive seasons thereafter, before a decline in the second half of the 1920s saw the club play their final campaign in the league in the 1929–30 season, finishing second from bottom.

In 2011, Houghton Town changed their name to Sunderland West End, signalling the first time in 81 years a club by the name of Sunderland West End had competed in the Wearside League. West End finished runners-up in the 2018–19 Wearside League season, gaining promotion to the Northern League Division Two. Sunderland West End entered the FA Vase for the first time in 2019–20.

Ground
The club currently play at the Ford Quarry Hub in Sunderland.

Records
Best FA Cup performance: Sixth qualifying round, 1904–05
Best FA Vase performance: Second qualifying round, 2019–20

References

Football clubs in England
Football clubs in Tyne and Wear
Wearside Football League
Northern Football League